Menara Mall is one of the largest shopping centres in Marrakesh, opened in June 2015. It has two levels totaling  dedicated as an indoor attraction park for children called 'Kidzo'. Together with the mall, a Mövenpick Hotel was erected.

References

External links 
 

Buildings and structures in Marrakesh
Shopping centres in Morocco
Tourist attractions in Marrakesh